According to the 2011 census, Czechs in Serbia number 1,824 of population.
National Council of the Czech National Minority in Serbia have seat in Bela Crkva in Vojvodina.

Demographics

Czechs form a majority in Češko Selo ("Czech Village") in the Eastern Danube part of Southern Banat in Vojvodina.

Notable people
Aleksandar Mašin, military officer and participant of the May Coup
Ivan Bek, Yugoslav football player
Ludmila Frajt, composer
Emil Hájek, composer and pianist
Rudolf Nováček, military composer
Zlatko Krasni, poet
Aleksandar Lifka, European cinematographer
Vladislav Titelbah, rural painter
František Zach, military theorist

See also

Czech-Serbian relations

References

 Borislav Jankulov, Pregled kolonizacije Vojvodine u XVIII i XIX veku, Novi Sad - Pančevo, 2003.

External links 
 Nacionalni savet češke nacionalne manjine | savetceha.rs 

Serbia
Ethnic groups in Serbia
Ethnic groups in Vojvodina